San Rafael, officially the Municipality of San Rafael,  is a 1st class municipality in the province of Bulacan, Philippines. According to the 2020 census, it has a population of 103,097 people.

With the continuous expansion of Metro Manila, San Rafael is now included in the Greater Manila's built-up conurbation area which reaches San Ildefonso, Bulacan at its northernmost part.

History

Spanish era
The San Juan de Dios Church still stands as the silent witness of the bloody battles that the Filipino insurgents fought during the Philippine Revolution of 1896.  This church was used as military barracks for almost three days, after the insurgents had destroyed all papers and documents they found in the convents.  When the Spanish Cazadores learned of these rebellious activities, they entered the church and fought the insurgents.  The combatants fought heavily inside the church to a point that blood was spilled all over the church floor.  The patio in front of the church was littered by dead bodies of Filipino insurgents.  The gobernadorcillo ordered people to dig a common grave near the church for the bodies of the insurgents.

American influence
The Americans succeeded the Spaniards with their policy of benevolent assimilation.  Schools were established as a potent factor for pacification.  In 1903, schools were opened in San Rafael.  The municipal building was used as a school house.  Since then, with the supervision of the American administrators, San Rafael has enjoyed the education and the progress which was denied to them during the three–century rule of the Spaniards.

In 1899, the Americans incorporated the town to Baliwag when Baliwag was intended to be the Provincial Capital of Bulacan.  However, due to a number of petitions of the people of San Rafael, especially when the plan to make Baliwag the capital of Bulacan did not materialize, the Americans where convinced to separate San Rafael as an independent town from Baliwag.  Mr. Julian V. Valte was appointed to be the first Presidente Municipal of San Rafael, and Mr. Emilio Reyes was the last.

In the year 1924 and 1927, with the help of some influential men, the Spaniards were able to get the signatures of the land owners of San Rafael and San Ildefonso to an agreement purporting to show their willingness to donate their lands to the Hospital of San Juan de Dios.

Thus the town of San Rafael and San Ildefonso became properties of the hospital and started to be called Hacienda de Buenavista until 1944, when it got back its original name.

Japanese occupation
The Commonwealth of the Philippines was invaded by the Empire of Japan in December 1941 shortly after Japan's declaration of war upon the United States of America, which controlled the Philippines at the time and possessed important military bases there. The combined American-Filipino army was defeated by April 1942.

In May, 1942, the Japanese government opened schools and introduced the teaching of Nippon-go.  As part of its war drive, Japanese propaganda included phrases like "Asia for the Asians!" and talked about the perceived need to liberate Asian countries from imperialist powers.  Similarly, the Philippines were propagandized about "American exploitation," "American Imperialism," and "American tyranny," and blame was laid on the United States for starting the war. They were assured that the American forces would not return and that they were not Japan's enemies.  The effect of this was considerably undermined by the actions of the Japanese Army, and the Filipinos soon waited for the return of the Americans to free them from the Japanese. Japanese education condemned anything American, tried to infuse Japanese culture and to teach Filipinos the concept of the Greater East Asia Co-Prosperity Sphere under the Japanese influence.

Socio–economic, educational and religious programs were largely non-existent. The people were deprived of property, food, supplies and shelter. They were forced or resorted to eat camote, wore jute sacks and tattered clothes.  The people of San Rafael evacuated to Upig, Licheria, Coral na Bato and Camachile.  Schools were closed and the church was ordered to stop performing its religious duties.

Guerrilla resistance against the Japanese continued throughout the war. Uncaptured Filipino army units, a communist insurgency and supporting American agents all played a role in the resistance. The people of San Rafael refused to be subjected to Japanese authority and they organized and joined small guerrilla bands and harassed the units of the Japanese army stationed in the town whenever there was a chance to do so.  These small, organized guerrillas in San Rafael later became members of BMA (Bulacan Military Area).

The liberation of San Rafael
When the American forces landed in Leyte in October 1944, the Japanese became more brutal. Hundreds met their death in the hands of the enemy.  One cruel incident occurred at Barrio Pulo. Men and women who were assembled where tied together, dynamites were strapped to many of them and these were later detonated by the Japanese captors. A lone survivor, Marcelo Mangahas, told the world of the gory incident.  Other atrocities followed.  However, the unity of the people of San Rafael and the heroism of the Filipino soldiers and guerrillas prevented further casualties and destruction.  When the Americans arrived, they found San Rafael liberated by the courageous guerrillas with the Filipino troops of the Philippine Commonwealth Army 32nd, 35th and 36th Infantry Division and the Philippine Constabulary 3rd Constabulary Regiment that were mostly from San Rafael.

Local Filipino troops of the 32nd, 35th and 36th Infantry Division of the Philippine Commonwealth Army and 3rd Constabulary Regiment of the Philippine Constabulary liberated the town in San Rafael, Bulacan and aided the guerrillas of the Bulacan Military Area (BMA) and defeated Japanese soldiers and aftermath in World War II.

Geography

Barangays
San Rafael is politically subdivided into 34 barangays (5 urban, 29 rural).

Climate

Demographics

Economy

Tourism

The 8 Waves Waterpark & Hotel is the prime resort of the Town, and is one of the biggest in the Philippines. The Big Rock Farm Resort is another notable resort of the Town which is located in Barangay Coral na Bato. The first specialty store of the popular Bulacan's Prime - The Home of Garlic Longaniza can also be found in San. Rafael who is well known for its Garlic and Sweet Longaniza. The Malangaan Cave and Spring, located in Barangay Tukod is a large cave untouched by quarry operations in San Rafael, Bulacan and according to the locals of the barangay, it was once a hiding place of guerillas during World War II.

Festivals
Every year, the town celebrates its Angel Festival in honor of their 2nd patron saint, Saint Raphael, together their town's pride, the Angel Festival, which attracts many tourists every year. It is a colorful celebration in honor of the Seven Archangels. This is held every 29 September.

This is highlighted by a parade participated by children from the public and private schools in San Rafael.  More than a thousand children in angel costumes in the street make it look like heaven has come down to the town of San Rafael. This is followed by an interpretative dancing competition by all participant schools. The Angel Festival was started last September 29, 2002 through the initiative of the San Juan de Dios Parish and the San Rafael Tourism Council.

Notable people
Ruperto Cruz Santos (born October 30, 1957), fourth and current Bishop of Balanga in Bataan  (July 8, 2010–present).

Gallery

References

External links

[ Philippine Standard Geographic Code]
All About San Rafael Bulacan
Philippine Census Information

Municipalities of Bulacan